The Princess was an automobile built in Detroit, Michigan by the Princess Motor Car Company from 1914 until 1918.

History 
The original Little Princess was a cyclecar that was altered into a light or small car and renamed the Princess. It was powered by a 1.6-liter Farmer engine.

In 1915, the company bought the Saxon factory and began production of roadster and touring automobiles with a four-cylinder 24hp G B & S engine. Prices were moderate at $775, . The company ceased production in 1918.

References
Defunct motor vehicle manufacturers of the United States
Motor vehicle manufacturers based in Michigan
Defunct manufacturing companies based in Michigan

Brass Era vehicles
1910s cars
Cars introduced in 1914
Vehicle manufacturing companies established in 1914
Vehicle manufacturing companies disestablished in 1918